Nukuhau  is a suburb of Taupō in the Waikato Region of New Zealand's North Island.

Demographics
Nukuhau includes the statistical area of Brentwood (Taupo District) and part of the area of Nukuhau-Rangatira Park.

Nukuhau had a population of 4,335 at the 2018 New Zealand census, an increase of 627 people (16.9%) since the 2013 census, and an increase of 879 people (25.4%) since the 2006 census. There were 1,731 households, comprising 2,112 males and 2,217 females, giving a sex ratio of 0.95 males per female, with 801 people (18.5%) aged under 15 years, 579 (13.4%) aged 15 to 29, 1,860 (42.9%) aged 30 to 64, and 1,098 (25.3%) aged 65 or older.

Ethnicities were 82.7% European/Pākehā, 19.0% Māori, 1.9% Pacific peoples, 7.2% Asian, and 2.1% other ethnicities. People may identify with more than one ethnicity.

The percentage of people born overseas was 20.9, compared with 27.1% nationally.

Although some people chose not to answer the census's question about religious affiliation, 47.5% had no religion, 38.8% were Christian, 2.2% had Māori religious beliefs, 1.1% were Hindu, 0.3% were Muslim, 0.5% were Buddhist and 2.0% had other religions.

Of those at least 15 years old, 576 (16.3%) people had a bachelor's or higher degree, and 726 (20.5%) people had no formal qualifications. 585 people (16.6%) earned over $70,000 compared to 17.2% nationally. The employment status of those at least 15 was that 1,605 (45.4%) people were employed full-time, 570 (16.1%) were part-time, and 75 (2.1%) were unemployed.

Marae

The suburb has two marae.

Nukuhau Marae and Rauhoto meeting house is a meeting place of the Ngāti Tūwharetoa hapū of Ngāti Rauhoto and Ngāti Te Urunga. In October 2020, the Government committed $1,338,668 from the Provincial Growth Fund to upgrade the marae and 4 other Ngāti Tūwharetoa marae, creating 19 jobs.

Te Rangiita Marae and meeting house for the Ngāti Tūwharetoa hapū of Ngāti Ruingarangi.

Education

References

Suburbs of Taupō
Populated places in Waikato
Populated places on Lake Taupō
Populated places on the Waikato River